Polypoetes wagneri is a moth of the family Notodontidae first described by James S. Miller in 2008. It is found in Costa Rica.

The length of the forewings is 13.5-15.5 mm for males and 15.5–16 mm for females. The ground color of the forewings is dark brown to charcoal gray or blackish brown. The central area of the hindwings is translucent white.

Etymology
The species is named in honor of David L. Wagner one of the leading experts on microlepidoptera systematics, and on Lepidoptera life histories in general.

References

Moths described in 2008
Notodontidae